Vincent Piazza (born ) is an American film, television and stage actor. He is best known for his portrayal of gangster Lucky Luciano in the HBO television series Boardwalk Empire. He has also played Earl Hefner in the comedy-drama Rocket Science (2007) and singer Tommy DeVito in Clint Eastwood's film adaptation of Jersey Boys (2014).

Early life and education 
Born in Middle Village and raised in Maspeth, Piazza is a native of the New York City borough of Queens. His father is Italian, having immigrated to the United States in the early 1960s. His mother is of German descent. He recalls humble beginnings and a prideful work ethic gained from watching his father work multiple jobs to support the family that included a younger brother and one older sister. Vincent also credits his mother's large German family for allowing several travels across the United States to visit distant relatives who encouraged him to find his passion, and see the world's many treasures.

He attended Archbishop Molloy High School in Queens, receiving scholarships for academics and becoming a member of the National Honor Society. He received several academic scholarships to a plethora of institutions, ultimately choosing to attend Villanova University where he majored in Sports and Media Management. Piazza played ACHA Division I club ice hockey for Villanova University, until a recurring shoulder injury forced him to quit playing and leave the university after only a year.

Career 
After retiring from hockey, he began to work with acting coach Alice Spivak and joined the TerraNOVA Collective theatre group in Lion Theatre along Theatre Row in New York City. After appearing in a number of New York Off Broadway productions, including Baby Steps, A Match Made in Manhattan and Much Ado About Nothing, he made his feature film debut in the 2006 film Stephanie Daley and went on to appear in the television movie The Dawn and an episode of Law & Order: Criminal Intent.

Piazza has appeared in three episodes of the television series The Sopranos; the eighth, eleventh and thirteenth episodes of the show's sixth season. He describes his experience working on the show as "incredible" and says he would appear in any prequels or sequels to the series if he was asked. He then featured in the 2007 film Rocket Science as Earl Hefner, the kleptomaniac older brother of the film's protagonist. After auditioning at a casting session held at a New York acting school, he ended up being one of the first actors cast, writer-director Jeffrey Blitz saying: "Vince brought just the right combination of humor and threat to the part ... [I] kept many of the rest of the choices Vince brought to Earl. He's a very physical actor and a very funny one, too." He went on to appear in the independent films Goodbye Baby, Tie a Yellow Ribbon and Apology, as well as guest-starring in an episode of Law & Order, before he landed the recurring role of Tony in Rescue Me's fourth season.

Piazza appeared in the 2008 film Assassination of a High School President in the role of Ricky Delacruz. He had originally unsuccessfully auditioned for a different part, but Brett Simon, the film's director, was fond of his performance in Rocket Science and so suggested that he take on another role. In order to master a Hispanic accent for the role, he visited a woman he knew who runs a Puerto Rican theatre in Manhattan and usually coached Puerto Ricans to adapt American accents, to have her coach him to read his lines in a thick Puerto Rican accent. He also completed a television pilot directed by Brett Ratner, Blue Blood, for which he had a seven-year contract if the series had been picked up by NBC.

Piazza was then cast as a series regular on Boardwalk Empire in 2009 as real life Italian-American mobster Lucky Luciano, appearing in all five seasons. In 2013, Piazza won the role of Tommy DeVito in the Clint Eastwood-directed adaptation of the Broadway musical Jersey Boys. Piazza had to take vocal, guitar, and dance lessons to play DeVito, one of the founding members of the band The Four Seasons.

Personal life 
Piazza was in a relationship with singer Ashlee Simpson from June 2011 to November 2012. As of May 21, 2018, he was engaged to actress Genesis Rodriguez but the relationship ended shortly after becoming engaged.

Filmography

Film

Television

References

External links 
 
  As Boardwalk Empire Meets its Final Season, Vincent Piazza Shines as Lucky Luciano Tiziano Thomas Dossena, L'Idea Magazine, 2014

21st-century American male actors
American male film actors
American male stage actors
American male television actors
American people of German descent
American people of Italian descent
Archbishop Molloy High School alumni
Living people
Male actors from New York City
People from Maspeth, Queens
People from Middle Village, Queens
Villanova Wildcats athletes
Year of birth missing (living people)